William McEneaney from the University of California, San Diego, was named Fellow of the Institute of Electrical and Electronics Engineers (IEEE) in 2014 for contributions to optimal control and estimation in nonlinear systems.

References

Fellow Members of the IEEE
Living people
Year of birth missing (living people)
Place of birth missing (living people)
University of California, San Diego faculty
American electrical engineers